Natural Heritage Education is an educational program offered by Ontario Parks in some provincial parks in Ontario, Canada. It is designed to provide education focusing on the natural and cultural heritage of the park its surrounding area. Parks such as Presqu'ile Provincial Park and Algonquin Provincial Park have very successful programs due to the use of multiple visitor centres, major park attractions, guided walks, children's programs, evening programs, night hikes, special event weekends and special event programs. 

For instance, at Algonquin Provincial Park, visitors can enjoy the wolf howl led by park naturalists. At Presqu'ile Provincial Park, campers can enjoy a Canada Day program or a walk through the park at night with park naturalists.

Several other park agencies such as Parks Canada, Alberta Provincial Parks and state and national parks in the U.S. have similar programs.

See also
Heritage interpretation

External links
Ontario Parks
Ontario parks with nature programs.
Nature conservation organizations based in Canada
Educational organizations based in Ontario
Environmental interpretation
Environmental organizations based in Ontario